"Love Is Dangerous" is a single released in 1990 by British-American band Fleetwood Mac from their album Behind the Mask. The single failed to chart on the US Hot 100, but reached number 7 on the Billboard Mainstream Rock Chart and number 70 in Canada. It was one of the album's two songs co-written by Stevie Nicks and Rick Vito. Vito recorded a solo version of the song for his album Crazy Cool in 2001.

Credits
Fleetwood Mac
 Stevie Nicks – lead vocals
 Rick Vito – lead guitar, lead vocals
 Billy Burnette – rhythm guitar, backing vocals
 Christine McVie – keyboards, synthesizer, backing vocals
 John McVie – bass guitar
 Mick Fleetwood – drums, percussion
Additional personnel
 Steve Croes – additional keyboards

Charts

References

External links
Behind the Mask - Fleetwood Mac | Songs, Reviews, Credits | AllMusic

Fleetwood Mac songs
Songs written by Stevie Nicks
Songs written by Rick Vito
1990 songs
Warner Records singles